Stol may refer to:
Stol, Babušnica, a village in Serbia
, mountain in Serbia
Stol (Serbian Carpathians), a mountain in Serbia
, a mountain in Slovenia
Stol (Karawanks) (Veliki Stol), a mountain on the border between Austria and Slovenia

See also
Stole (disambiguation)
Stoll (disambiguation)
Stolle, a surname
STOL (short takeoff and landing), aircraft technology
STOL (Systems Test and Operations Language), a spacecraft command language